White Rock is an unincorporated community in Fayetteville Township, Washington County, Arkansas, United States. It is located about three miles west of Fayetteville on Arkansas Highway 16. Goose Creek is just south of the community.

References

Unincorporated communities in Washington County, Arkansas
Unincorporated communities in Arkansas